The 2019–20 Iraqi Premier League was the 46th season of the Iraqi Premier League, the highest division for Iraqi association football clubs, since its establishment in 1974. The season started on 18 September 2019 in a double round-robin format, but was postponed after 23 October 2019 due to the 2019–2020 Iraqi protests with matches from the first four rounds having been played.

On 25 January 2020, with the withdrawal of five of the 20 teams that started the season, the Iraq Football Association (IFA) decided to annul the results of all the matches that had been played so far and not to relegate any teams at the end of the season. The league was restarted on 16 February 2020 as a single round-robin tournament.

Matches from the first five rounds of the restarted season were played, but the season was postponed after 10 March 2020 due to the COVID-19 pandemic, and it was officially cancelled on 3 June 2020. The results of the 2018–19 season were used to determine the teams that qualified for the 2021 AFC Champions League.

Teams

Original season

League table at abandonment

Results

Restarted season

League table at abandonment

Results

Statistics

Hat-tricks 

Notes
(A) – Away team

Awards

References

Iraqi Premier League seasons
1
Iraq
Iraqi Premier League